This is a list of islands known to be named after individual people. It details the name of the island, its location and eponym.

Former:
 Isla de Apodaca, British Columbia, Canada – Dr. Salvador Apodaca (Bishop of the city of Linares, Nuevo León, Mexico) – now Bowen Island
 Banks Island, Queensland, Australia – Joseph Banks – now Moa Island
 Bedloe's Island, New York, United States – Isaack Bedloo (merchant) – now Liberty Island
 Blackwell's Island, New York, United States – Robert Blackwell – now Roosevelt Island
 Fernando Pó, Equatorial Guinea – Fernão do Pó – now Bioko
Krusenstern Island, Adam Johann von Krusenstern
 Mulgrave Island, Queensland, Australia – Earl Mulgrave – now Badu Island
 Prince of Wales Isle, Malaysia – George IV, Prince of Wales – now Penang Island 
 Queen Charlotte Islands, British Columbia, Canada – Queen Charlotte of Mecklenburg-Strelitz – now Haida Gwaii
 San Cristobal, Solomon Islands – Saint Christopher – now Makira
Sebald Islands – Sebald de Weert; now Jason Islands
 Van Diemen's Land – Anthony van Diemen

See also
List of eponyms
List of places named after people

References

Eponyms
Islands
Lists of islands